Erika Geréd, sometimes written as Erika Gered (born 28 April 1999) is a Romanian footballer of hungarian ethnicity who plays as a midfielder for Vasas Femina FC and has appeared for the Romania women's national team.

Career
Gered has been capped for the Romania national team, appearing for the team during the 2019 FIFA Women's World Cup qualifying cycle.

International goals

References

External links
 
 
 

1999 births
Living people
Romanian women's footballers
Romania women's international footballers
Women's association football midfielders
Romanian sportspeople of Hungarian descent